Vorkosigan is an important surname in Lois McMaster Bujold's science fiction series, the Vorkosigan Saga.

Vorkosigan can refer to:
Miles Vorkosigan – Aral Vorkosigan's son and the main character of most of the series
Mark Vorkosigan – Miles's clone brother

Additionally, the following characters, each married to one of the above, are either Lady or Countess Vorkosigan, depending on the time.
Ekaterin Vorsoisson – Eventually, Miles's wife